Justice McCall may refer to:

Abner V. McCall (1915–1995), justice of the Supreme Court of Texas in 1956
Edward Everett McCall (1863–1924), justice of the Supreme Court of New York (the trial court of the state) from 1902 to 1913